Pabra, is a village and administrative unit with a democratically elected panchayat samiti (local council) in Uklana Tehsil of Hisar district under Hisar Lok Sabha constituency and Hisar Division of Haryana state.

Administration
It has own unreserved Gram Panchayat under Gram Panchayat Smiti. There is a Patwari (government land record officer), an ADO (Agriculture Development Officer), a Rural Health Officer (RHO), and an Anganbadi Worker. Pabra is 35 kms from Hisar bus stand.

Jat gotras
The following Jat gotras are found in the village:

Grewal
 Kundu
((Nain)))
 Dhillon
 Sihag
 Sinhmar
 Damiwal
 DUHAN

See also

 Bidhwan
 Badya Jattan
 Barwas
 Mandholi Kalan
 Kanwari
 Zaildar
 List of Zaildars by Zail

References

External links
 Google location map
 Hisar District Website

Villages in Hisar district